Academic grading in India is based on a percentage system and they are called GPA or CGPA.

Overview
In India, grading is different for different boards.

The national board Central Board of Secondary Education uses a percentage system coupled with a positional grade that indicates the student's performance with respect to their peers. The Indian Certificate of Secondary Education board doesn't and gives only the mark obtained. State boards may give either or both marks and grades; if grades are given, most grade students linearly (e.g.: A+ for >90, A for 80–90 for Kerala state).

Many colleges outside India favour CBSE and ICSE; those colleges either outright disallow students from other boards (e.g.: University of Oxford) or require them to write additional examinations (e.g.: National University of Singapore).

Generally, at the school level percentages of 75–85 are considered average while above 95 is exceptional. At the university level however percentages between 60–79 are considered excellent and are difficult to obtain. The direct comparison of the percentage of marks obtained at one university with that at another is difficult. Indeed, the differential between universities in terms of marking scale can be as much as 20%, with some requiring an 85% plus for the award of Distinction, an approximate equivalent of the Latin honor summa-cum-laude, while yet others would award Distinction at above of 70%.

In some instances, a score close to 90% is very rare and is virtually impossible. Much of this can be reconciled in the backdrop of the minimum pass score. In a university with a 90% plus for Distinction, 60% may be the minimum passing mark. The university awarding distinction at 70% may have a passing mark of 45%. Thus the comparison of GPA (grade-point average) is quite difficult for Indian students elsewhere. A student having 95% will be close to 3.9 on the GPA scale, as would a student with a 75% from a 70% cut-off-for-distinction institution.

Grade-point average (2011 alternate version) 
In India, many universities and institutes rank their students in percentage of marks they get from the examinations and credits. Many universities have their ranking on point system. Though there are exceptions to standard system such as MBA Courses, the following table will summarize the grading system and conversions for normal graduation and post graduation in universities and institutes, unless otherwise declared by the institute. 
 ** Some institutes with difficult curriculum and tough scoring give 70% scoring as Distinction
 ** Universities like the Jamia Millia University have different CPI system of evaluating B.Tech degree students. They have and give First Division at 60% Marks and Distinction / Honors at 75%.

Grading 

The 10 point GPA introduced by University of Mumbai is categorized as follows:

International grade conversion 

International grade conversion for percentages scored in Indian universities.
*At selected institutions, a lower grade may be considered passing.

References

India
Grading
Grading